The San Lucas Altarpiece, also known as the San Lucas Polyptych, is a polyptych panel painting by Northern Italian Renaissance painter Andrea Mantegna. The altarpiece is a polyptych panel painting featuring 12 figures each in his or her own arch. The seven figures in the top row flank the central figure of Jesus Christ. The five beneath flank Saint Luke.

History
On August 10, 1453, Mantegna signed a contract to paint the work for the monastery of Santa Giustina in Padua. In return for 50 ducats, Mantegna agreed to complete the work, providing paints with which to depict the figures and the azzurro Todesco (a blue pigment derived from copper) with which to inlay them. The work was completed within that or the following year. The polyptych is located in Pinacoteca di Brera, Milan.

Notes

References

External links

Pinacoteca di Brera
Web Gallery of Art

1453 paintings
Paintings by Andrea Mantegna
Paintings in the collection of the Pinacoteca di Brera
Paintings depicting Jesus
Polyptychs
Paintings of Benedict of Nursia